Baghali ghatogh (Persian: باقالی قاتق) is a northern Iranian dish made with fava beans, dill, and eggs. It's usually served with kateh (Persian rice dish) in northern provinces such as Gilan and Mazandaran, and can be considered a khoresh (Persian stew). It is spiced with turmeric, salt, garlic, and sometimes pepper. 

Outside of Iran this dish is made with either lima beans, kidney beans or fava beans. If using dried beans, they should be soaked overnight (this will shorten cooking time).

See also 
 Caspian cuisine
 Nargesi

References  

Iranian cuisine
Iranian stews
Egg dishes
Legume dishes